Anthony Harwick Wilkinson (born April 1937) is the co-owner and former chairman of the British high street chain Wilko.

Early life
Anthony Harwick Wilkinson was born in April 1937, the son of Wilko founder James Kemsey Wilkinson and his wife Mary Cooper.

Career
When Tony Wilkinson retired as chairman after 45 years in June 2005, he was replaced by his niece, Karin Swann, and his daughter, Lisa Wilkinson. In 2014, Karin Swann sold her family's 50% holding in the business to Lisa Wilkinson.

In May 2019, the Sunday Times Rich List estimated his net worth at £252 million.

References

1937 births
English businesspeople
Living people